Bidya Bhattarai (also Bidhya Bhattarai) is a Nepali politician and a member of the House of Representatives of the Federal parliament of Nepal. She won the by-election of Kaski-2, a constituency that was made empty by the premature death of her husband, cabinet minister Rabindra Prasad Adhikari, in a helicopter crash in February 2019. She defeated her nearest rival, Khemraj Paudel of Nepali Congress, by a margin of more than 8,000 votes. She was re-elected in 2022 from the same constituency.

References

Living people
Place of birth missing (living people)
People from Kaski District
Nepal Communist Party (NCP) politicians
Communist Party of Nepal (Unified Marxist–Leninist) politicians
Nepal MPs 2017–2022
1972 births
Nepal MPs 2022–present